The Battle of Wayna Daga was a large-scale battle between the Ethiopian forces and the Portuguese Empire and the forces of the Adal Sultanate and the Ottoman Empire in the east of Lake Tana in Ethiopia on 21 February 1543. The available sources give different dates for the battle. Led by the Emperor Galawdewos, the combined army of Ethiopian and Portuguese troops defeated the Adal-Ottoman army led by Imam Ahmad ibn Ibrahim al-Ghazi. One tradition states that Ahmad was shot by a musketeer before being beheaded. Once the Imam's soldiers learned of his death, they fled the battlefield.

Background
At the Battle of Wofla (28 August 1542), Imam Ahmad had crushed the Portuguese expeditionary force, killing most of its men, capturing practically all of the firearms they had, and capturing and killing its leader, Cristóvão da Gama. The Imam enjoyed a decisive victory over his greatest foe; armies in the Horn of Africa melted away with the death of their leaders. He then reduced the number of the mercenary Ottoman arquebusiers to 200, and relying on his own forces retired to Emfraz near Lake Tana for the coming rainy season. Miguel de Castanhoso states that these arquebusiers left his service because they were upset that he beheaded da Gama, whom they wanted to present to the Ottoman emperor. However, Beckingham notes that a Hadhrami chronicle states that some of them threatened the Imam's life unless he gave them 10,000 ounces of gold, to which he "gave a very favorable reply". When the rest of the group learned of their success, they came to the Imam and made a similar demand; deciding that he had no further need of their services, he sent them home giving them 2,000 ounces of gold.

However, de Gama had inspired a fierce loyalty in his surviving followers, all but 50 of whom had reassembled after their defeat around Queen Seble Wongel, and taken refuge at  "The Mountain of the Jews", which Whiteway identifies as Amba Sel. Castanhoso, writing decades after the fact, states that after the Emperor Gelawdewos had joined the survivors, and seeing the number of men who flocked to the Emperor's standard, at Christmas "we went to the Preste, and begged him to help us avenge the death of Dom Christovão." Gelawdewos agreed to march against the Imam. The Portuguese firearms which had been stored at Debre Damo were produced. A message was sent to a company of Portuguese soldiers who had proceeded to Debarwa to find passage home, but they failed to respond in time for the coming battle.

The allied forces spent the following months marching the provinces before heading to Imam Ahmad's camp next to Lake Tana. On 13 February 1543, they defeated a group of cavalry and infantry led by the Imam's lieutenant Sayid Mehmed in Wogera (roughly corresponding to the modern woreda of the same name), killing Sayid Mehmed. From the prisoners it was learned that the Imam was camped only 5 days' march away at Deresgue, and flush with victory the army marched to confront their enemy.

Location
As with many of the battles in Castanhoso's narrative, published 20 years after the events they describe, the exact location where the two forces encountered one another is not known. General histories of Ethiopia are vague: Paul B. Henze, in his Layers of Time, implies the battlefield was near Lake Tana, and in a footnote states that much of the combat activity at this time "would seem to have been in Gaynt", the former province located southeast of Lake Tana. Richard Pankhurst in The Ethiopian: A History places the engagement in "Western Bagemder", which covered the area corresponding to the contemporary Debub Gondar Zone. Lastly, the name itself is of little help: "Wayna Daga" is the traditional Amharic word for the climatic regions between the higher, mountainous "Daga" elevations (2,600 meters above sea level and above) and the lowland "Qolla" elevations (between 1,400 and 2,000 meters above sea level). Most of the lands around Lake Tana fall into this middle climatic region.

Whiteway, in his introduction to Castanhoso's account, discusses the evidence he was able to compile for its location. Castanhoso himself does not name the place; it was Pedro Páez who first provided the name of "Wayna Daga". Paez's younger contemporary, Jerónimo Lobo, locates the battle at a place called Granhi Berr Jaaf Granhi, or "Granhi's Gate, Granhi's Tree"; Lobo was told the locale acquired this name when Imam Ahmad, finding himself mortally wounded in the battle, "in great pain and rage, took the unsheathed scimitar with which he was fighting and struck a blow on the trunk of a tree near him". Lobo adds that he was shown the place, tree and mark. James Bruce, travelling south of Dengel Ber over three centuries later, mentions passing "the small village of Waindega, famous for the decisive battle fought between King Claudius and the Moor Gragne", adding in a footnote that the village was "otherwise called Graneber." However, as Whiteway points out, "The difficulty that presents itself to my mind is, to understand by what possible strategy one army starting from Darasgue, and the other from Woggera, neither desiring to avoid an engagement, and both starting-places being north of Lake Tzana, the decisive battle could have taken place at its south-west corner." Bruce may have been of the same mind, for earlier in his lengthy account of Ethiopian history, when he recounts the Battle of Wayna Daga Bruce appears to indicate the two armies fought at the north-east corner of the lake. Whiteway notes that two explorers, Combes and Tamisier, who crossed the mountainous country north-east of Lake Tana in 1835 call that region "Ouenadega" or Wayna Daga, and he concludes his discussion by locating the battle there.

Battle
Once the Ethiopian army found the army of Imam Ahmad, they set up camp nearby; Emperor Gelawedewos advised against engaging the enemy right away, hoping that the 50 missing Portuguese soldiers would arrive soon as "in that country fifty Portuguese are a greater reinforcement than one thousand natives." Over the following days, each camp proceeded to harass the other with cavalry raids. The allied side had the better of the exchange, keeping their opponents from venturing from their camp for supplies, until the Imam's camp managed to kill the leading Ethiopian soldier, Azmach Keflo, which demoralized the Ethiopian troops. Faced with the potential desertion of his force, Galawedewos decided he could wait no longer and prepared for an assault the next day.

The two forces started the main battle early the next day, with the Adal-Ottoman force divided into two groups. At first, the Muslim side succeeded in driving the allied side back, until a charge by the Ethiopian cavalry drove back the Muslim force. The Imam, seeing his men loosing ground, moved up to them, encouraging them, with his son at his side. It was here that the Imam was hit by a bullet to his chest which threw him from his horse, although the sources differ in how he died.

According to Castanhoso, the Imam was recognized by the Portuguese arquebusiers, who directed their combined firepower at him, and one of the arquebuses in the group fired the shot. Although he was an eyewitness to the battle, Castanhoso constantly emphasizes in his account the corporate identity of the Portuguese expedition after Gama's death: "We bore before us the banner of Holy Compassion (Sancta Misericordia); the Preste had sought to appoint one of us Captain, but we desired none save the banner of himself to lead us, for it was not to be anticipated that we should follow another, having lost what we had lost."

There is another tradition, at least as old as João Bermudes, and repeated by every other near-contemporary source (e.g., Gaspar Correia, Jerónimo Lobo), that gives the credit to one João de Castilho; João charged into the Adal troops so he could fire upon Ahmad Gragn at point-blank range, an audacious act resulting in his death. Both Castanhoso and the story of João de Castilho return to agreement about Imam Ahmad's fate after this point: at the end of the battle, when Emperor Galawedewos offered his sister's hand in marriage to the man who killed the Imam, one of his captains, Azmach Calite, a youth, presented the Imam's head as proof of the deed; but a subsequent investigation revealed that the Portuguese had mortally wounded him before the soldier had cut off the Imam's head, "thus he did not give his sister to that man, nor did he reward the Portuguese, as it was not known who wounded him".

When his followers knew that he was wounded to the death, they lost heart and took to flight. An exception was the captain of the Ottoman arquebusiers,
 When the Capitan of the Turks saw that the Moors were giving way, he determined to die; with bared arms, and a long broadsword in his hand, he swept a great space in front of him; he fought like a valiant cavalier, for five Abyssinian horsemen were on him, who could neither make him yield nor slay him. One of them attacked him with a javelin; he wrenched it from his hand, he houghed another's horse, and none dared approach him. There came up a Portuguese horseman, by name Gonçalo Fernandes, who charged him spear in rest and wounded him sorely; the Turk grasped it [the spear] so firmly, that before he could disengage himself the Moor gave him a great cut above the knee that severed all the sinews and crippled him; finding himself wounded, he drew his sword and killed him.

Imam Ahmad's wife Bati del Wambara managed to escape with a group of the surviving Ottoman arquebusiers, 300 horsemen of her personal guard, and as much of the Imam's treasure as they could carry. The moment they left their camp, the victorious Ethiopian army poured in, slaughtering everyone they encountered except for women and children. Amongst the women were numerous Christian captives and, as Castanhoso tells the story, "some found sisters, others daughters, others their wives, and it was for them no small delight to see them delivered from captivity."

Aftermath
According to Bruce, there remained one enemy leader, Joram, with a sizable force still at large. Joram had driven Gelawdewos "from his hiding-place on Mount Tsalem, and forced him to cross the Tacazze on foot, with equal danger of being drowned or taken." Joram had been unable to join the Imam before the battle, and Emperor Gelawdewos learned he was hastening towards him, unaware that the battle had already been lost. Gelawdewos sent out a party who successfully ambushed him, "which closed the account of Claudius with his father's enemies."

The father of the Bahr negus, who had despaired of the rightful Emperor being restored to power and had come to be a valuable supporter of the Imam, sought pardon from Gelawdewos, offering Imam Ahmad's son in exchange; despite the Emperor's anger at the man's betrayal, out of respect for the Bahr negus, who had provided critical help in getting the Portuguese expedition into Ethiopia, Gelawdewos consented to the offer. The Imam's son later proved a useful prize, for he was later exchanged for the Emperor's own brother, Menas, who later succeeded Gelawdewos. A number of other Christians who had joined Imam Ahmed Gragn accompanied the Bahr negus father into camp, but not having the influence or bargaining chip he did, the Emperor ordered the execution of some of them. Other individuals who sought his safe-conduct, the Emperor Gelawdewos granted it, "for there were so many that had he ordered all to be killed, he would have remained alone."

By Easter (25 March), it became clear to Gelawdewos that he would not be able to make a circuit of his newly-won empire to impress his authority on all parts of it before the start of the rainy season, so he set up camp "three leagues away" in an unnamed location on the shores of Lake Tana. Once the rains had ended, Emperor Gelawdewos began the long task of consolidating his rule.

Notes

Further reading
 

Wayna Daga
Wayna Daga
Wayna Daga
Wayna Daga
Wayna Daga
Wayna Daga
Wayna Daga
Wayna Daga
Wayna Daga
Military history of Somaliland
Wayna Daga